Miogryllus lineatus, the western striped cricket, is a species of cricket in the family Gryllidae. It is found in North America.

References

Gryllinae
Articles created by Qbugbot
Insects described in 1876